The 2015 WTA Legends Classic was a women's tennis exhibition event held during the 2015 WTA Finals in Singapore at the Singapore Indoor Stadium.

Martina Navratilova won the tournament in an innovative doubles format that saw her earn the highest game-winning percentage after three doubles matches played.

Results
  Martina Navratilova (2–1, 23–15)
  Arantxa Sánchez Vicario (2–1, 21–17)
  Tracy Austin (2–1, 20–18)
  Marion Bartoli (0–3, 12–26)

Matches

References

2015 Legends Classic
Finals
l